The Bermuda Department of Statistics, subject to the Bermuda Statistics Act of 2002 as further amended, reports to the head of Cabinet Office. It was created mainly  for the collection, compilation, analysis and publication of statistical information and so facilitate the development of a statistical system for Bermuda which is also a component of the regional statistical systems of CARICOM, together with other member countries of this regional institution.

Mission
In accordance with the provisions of the Statistics Act 
to collect, compile, collate, analyse, abstract and publish statistical information relating to the commercial, industrial, social, financial, economic, and general activities and conditions of the people of Bermuda;
to take any census of population and housing in Bermuda;
to collaborate with Ministries, other Government Departments and public authorities in the collection, compilation, collation and publication of statistical information, including statistics derived from the activities of those Ministries, departments or public authorities;
to promote the avoidance of duplication in the information collected by Ministries, other Government Departments and public authorities; 
and generally to promote, organise and develop an integrated scheme of economic and social statistics relating to Bermuda

Organisation
The department is organised in five work divisions:
 Administration Division
 Business Statistics Division
 Social Statistics Division
 Economic Statistics Division
 Census and Survey Research Statistics Division

History
{| class="wikitable"
|+ Previous heads of the Department of statistics
! width=300 | Name
! width=100

Valerie Robinson James

| - Qt2 2014 
|}

See also
Sub-national autonomous statistical services
United Nations Statistics Division

References

External links
Cabinet Office
Bermuda Department of Statistics
CARICOM Statistics

Official statistics
Bermuda